Qarah Aqashli (also Romanized as Qarah Āqāshlī and Qareh Āqāshlī) is a village in Golidagh Rural District, Golidagh District, Maraveh Tappeh County, Golestan Province, Iran. At the 2006 census, its population was 95, in 18 families.

References 

Populated places in Maraveh Tappeh County